In quantum mechanics, the Wigner–Weyl transform or Weyl–Wigner transform (after Hermann Weyl and Eugene Wigner) is the invertible mapping between functions in the quantum phase space formulation and Hilbert space operators in the Schrödinger picture.

Often the mapping from functions on phase space to operators is called the Weyl transform or Weyl quantization, whereas the inverse mapping, from operators to functions on phase space, is called the Wigner transform.  This mapping was originally devised by Hermann Weyl in 1927 in an attempt to map symmetrized classical phase space functions to operators, a procedure known as Weyl quantization.  It is now understood that Weyl quantization does not satisfy all the properties one would require for consistent quantization and therefore sometimes yields unphysical answers. On the other hand, some of the nice properties described below suggest that if one seeks a single consistent  procedure mapping functions on the classical phase space to operators, the Weyl quantization is the best option: a sort of normal coordinates of such maps. (Groenewold's theorem asserts that no such map can have all the ideal properties one would desire.)

Regardless, the Weyl–Wigner transform is a well-defined integral transform between the phase-space and operator representations, and yields insight into the workings of quantum mechanics. Most importantly, the Wigner quasi-probability distribution is the Wigner transform of the quantum density matrix, and, conversely, the density matrix is the Weyl transform of the Wigner function. 

In contrast to Weyl's original intentions in seeking a consistent quantization scheme, this map merely amounts to a change of representation within quantum mechanics; it need not connect "classical" with "quantum" quantities. For example, the phase-space function may depend explicitly on Planck's constant ħ, as it does in some familiar cases involving angular momentum.  This invertible representation change then allows one to express quantum mechanics in phase space, as was appreciated in the 1940s by Hilbrand J. Groenewold and José Enrique Moyal.

Definition of the Weyl quantization of a general observable
The following explains the Weyl transformation on the simplest, two-dimensional Euclidean phase space. Let the coordinates on phase space be , and let   be a function defined everywhere on phase space. In what follows, we fix operators P and Q satisfying the canonical commutation relations, such as the usual position and momentum operators in the Schrödinger representation. We assume that the exponentiated operators  and  constitute an irreducible representation of the Weyl relations, so that the Stone–von Neumann theorem (guaranteeing uniqueness of the canonical commutation relations) holds.

The basic formula

The Weyl transform (or Weyl quantization) of the function   is given by the following operator in Hilbert space, 

Throughout,   ħ  is the reduced Planck constant.  

In that case, the Weyl transform can be written as
.

A less symmetric form, but handy for applications, is the following,

In the position representation
The Weyl map may then also be expressed in terms of the integral kernel matrix elements of this operator,

The inverse map
The inverse of the above Weyl map is the Wigner map, which takes the operator  back to the original phase-space kernel function , 

For example, the Wigner map of the oscillator thermal distribution operator   is 

If one replaces  in the above expression with an arbitrary operator, the resulting function  may depend on Planck's constant , and may well describe quantum-mechanical processes, provided it is properly composed through the star product, below.
In turn, the Weyl map of the Wigner map is summarized by Groenewold's formula,

The Weyl quantization of polynomial observables
For example, the Wigner map of the quantum angular-momentum-squared operator L2 is not just the classical angular momentum squared, but it further contains an offset term  ,  which accounts for the nonvanishing angular momentum of the ground-state Bohr orbit.

Properties

Weyl quantization of polynomials

For example, we have

In such cases, we can use instead McCoy's formula

There is no contradiction, however, since the canonical commutation relations allow for more than one expression for the same operator.

It is widely thought that the Weyl quantization, among all quantization schemes, comes as close as possible to mapping the Poisson bracket on the classical side to the commutator on the quantum side. (An exact correspondence is impossible, in light of Groenewold's theorem.) For example,  Moyal showed  the 

Weyl quantization of general functions
 If  is a real-valued function, then its Weyl-map image   is self-adjoint.
 If  is an element of Schwartz space, then  is trace-class.
 More generally,  is a densely defined unbounded operator.
 The map  is one-to-one on the Schwartz space (as a subspace of the square-integrable functions).

Deformation quantization
Intuitively, a deformation of a mathematical object is a family of the same kind of objects that depend on some parameter(s). 
Here, it provides rules for how to deform the "classical" commutative algebra of observables to a quantum non-commutative algebra of observables.

The basic setup in deformation  theory is to start with an algebraic structure (say a Lie algebra) and ask: Does there exist a one or more parameter(s) family of similar structures, such that for an initial value of the parameter(s) one has the same structure (Lie algebra) one started with? (The oldest illustration of this may be the realization of Eratosthenes in the ancient world that a flat earth was deformable to a spherical earth, with deformation parameter 1/R⊕.) E.g., one may define a noncommutative torus as a deformation quantization through  a  ★-product to implicitly address all convergence subtleties (usually not addressed in formal deformation quantization). Insofar as the algebra of functions on a space determines the geometry of that space, the study of the star product leads to the study of a non-commutative geometry deformation of that space.

For the Weyl-map example above, the ★-product may be written in terms of the Poisson bracket as

Here,  Π is the Poisson bivector, an operator defined such that its powers are

and

where {f1, f2} is the Poisson bracket. More generally,

where  is the binomial coefficient.

Thus, e.g., Gaussians compose hyperbolically,
 
or
 
etc.
These formulas are predicated on coordinates in which the Poisson bivector is constant (plain flat Poisson brackets). For the general formula on arbitrary Poisson manifolds, cf. the Kontsevich quantization formula.

Antisymmetrization of this ★-product yields the Moyal bracket, the proper quantum deformation of the Poisson bracket, and the phase-space isomorph (Wigner transform) of the quantum commutator in the more usual Hilbert-space formulation of quantum mechanics. As such, it provides the cornerstone of the dynamical equations of observables in this phase-space formulation.

There results a complete phase space formulation of quantum mechanics, completely equivalent to the Hilbert-space operator representation, with star-multiplications paralleling operator multiplications isomorphically.

Expectation values in phase-space quantization are obtained isomorphically to tracing operator observables  with the density matrix in Hilbert space:  they are obtained by phase-space integrals of observables such as the above  with the Wigner quasi-probability distribution effectively serving as a measure.

Thus, by expressing quantum mechanics in phase space (the same ambit as for classical mechanics), the above Weyl map facilitates recognition of quantum mechanics as a deformation (generalization, cf. correspondence principle) of classical mechanics, with deformation parameter .  (Other familiar deformations in physics involve the deformation of classical Newtonian into relativistic mechanics, with deformation parameter v/c; or the deformation of Newtonian gravity into General Relativity, with deformation parameter Schwarzschild-radius/characteristic-dimension. Conversely, group contraction leads to the vanishing-parameter undeformed theories—classical limits.)

Classical expressions, observables,  and operations (such as Poisson brackets) are modified by -dependent quantum corrections, as the conventional commutative multiplication applying in classical mechanics is generalized to the noncommutative star-multiplication characterizing quantum mechanics and underlying its uncertainty principle.

Despite its name, usually  Deformation Quantization  does not constitute a successful quantization scheme, namely a method to produce a quantum  theory out of a classical one. Nowadays, it amounts to a mere representation change from Hilbert space to phase space.

Generalizations
In more generality, Weyl quantization is studied in cases where the phase space is a symplectic manifold, or possibly a Poisson manifold. Related structures include the Poisson–Lie groups and Kac–Moody algebras.

See also

 Canonical commutation relation
 Heisenberg group
 Moyal bracket
 Weyl algebra
 Functor
Pseudo-differential operator
 Wigner quasi-probability distribution
 Stone–von Neumann theorem
 Phase space formulation of quantum mechanics
 Kontsevich quantization formula 
Gabor–Wigner transform
 Oscillator representation

References

Further reading
 (Sections I to IV of this article provide an overview over the Wigner–Weyl transform, the Wigner quasiprobability distribution, the phase space formulation of quantum mechanics and the example of the quantum harmonic oscillator.)
 
Terence Tao's 2012   notes on Weyl ordering

Mathematical quantization
Mathematical physics
Foundational quantum physics
Concepts in physics